Andrew J. Spano (born April 17, 1936) is an American politician who served as Westchester County Executive from 1998 to 2009. Spano was defeated by challenger Rob Astorino in the November 2009 election.

He was elected County Executive in 1997, and reelected in 2001 and 2005. Prior to his election as County Executive, Andrew Spano was Westchester County Clerk from 1982 to 1994. He currently serves on the Westchester Community College Board of Trustees where is the chair the Shared Governance Committee. 

He also served on the board of County Executives of America, an organization representing the interests of counties nationwide.

Since 2014, Spano has been a Commissioner of the New York State Board of Elections.

References

External links
Official Biography of CE Andrew J. Spano 
CEA Board of Directors

1936 births
Living people
Westchester County, New York Executives
County clerks in New York (state)
2000 United States presidential electors
Intelligent Community Forum
Election law